John Mahlon Ogden (November 5, 1897 – November 9, 1977), was a Major League Baseball pitcher. He played several seasons with the then minor league Baltimore Orioles, became a baseball executive and a scout after his retirement and is a member of the International League Hall of Fame.

Early life and education
Ogden was born in Ogden, Pennsylvania.  The town is named after Ogden's family who lived on the land now known as Upper Chichester, Southwest of Philadelphia for generations.  Ogden's ancestor had come to America from England on the same ship as William Penn.  Ogden was a three sport athlete at Chester High School.

Ogden attended Swarthmore College, where he played baseball and was a member of Phi Psi.

Career
Ogden was signed out of college by the Giants in 1918, but pitched just five games in relief before being sent to the minor league Newark Bears of the International League. In January 1919, he was traded along with four other players—including future Hall of Famer Waite Hoyt—to the Rochester Hustlers for catcher Earl Smith.

After spending one season with Rochester, Ogden joined the Baltimore Orioles, for whom he was a rotation mainstay for eight seasons, leading the International League in wins four times.

He finally returned to the majors in 1928, ten years after his debut, with the St. Louis Browns. He pitched two seasons in St. Louis, then missed the entire  season before pitching two more seasons for the Reds. Ogden returned to Baltimore in 1934 and retired as an Oriole.

After his retirement from playing baseball, Ogden accepted the position of Vice President and General Mangager of the Orioles and became assistant to Philadelphia Phillies President Gerald Nugent in 1939.

In 1941, Ogden became the owner of the Elmira Pioneers, a minor league baseball team in the Pennsylvania–Ontario–New York League (PONY League).

Ogden was a scout for the Boston Braves and the Philadelphia Phillies best known for signing Dick Allen.

Awards

In 1952, Ogden was elected to the International League Hall of Fame.

In 1956, Ogden was inducted into the Delaware County Athletes Hall of Fame.

In 1968, Ogden was inducted into Baltimore baseball's Shrine of Immortals.

Personal life
Ogden's brother, Warren "Curly" Ogden, was also a pitcher for Swarthmore and went on to play in Major League Baseball for the Philadelphia Athletics and the Washington Senators.

Ogden married Swarthmore College classmate Dorothy Wills Young in April 1920.  Together they had one son, John. M. Ogden, Jr., in July 1923.

Ogden died at Lankenau Medical Center in Wynnewood, Pennsylvania on November 9, 1977 and is interred at the Oxford Cemetery in Oxford, Pennsylvania.

References

External links

1897 births
1977 deaths
Major League Baseball pitchers
New York Giants (NL) players
St. Louis Browns players
Cincinnati Reds players
Boston Braves scouts
Chester High School alumni
Cincinnati Reds scouts
Milwaukee Braves scouts
Philadelphia Phillies scouts
Baseball players from Pennsylvania
People from Upper Chichester Township, Pennsylvania
Swarthmore Garnet Tide baseball players
Newark Bears (IL) players
Rochester Hustlers players
Baltimore Orioles (IL) players
Rochester Red Wings players